Golam Jilani Chowdhury A politician in Sunamganj District of Sylhet Division of Bangladesh. He is a member of parliament from Sunamganj-2 seat in the 1988 fourth parliamentary election.

Birth and early life 
Golam Jilani Chowdhury was born in the Sunamganj District of the Sylhet Division in Bangladesh.

Political life 
Sunamganj District politician Ghulam Jilani Chowdhury filed a case in the Electoral Tribunal on charges of tampering with the fourth parliamentary elections. Tribunal declared Ghulam Jilani Chowdhury a winner. But Suranjit enjoyed the full term of Parliament at that time. Due to the issuance of Ershad's military rule, Jilani's fate was no longer in parliament.

See also 
 Sunamganj-1
 1988 Bangladeshi general election

References

External links 
 List of 4th Parliament Members – Jatiya Sangsad

People from Sunamganj District
Living people
4th Jatiya Sangsad members
Jatiya Party politicians
Year of birth missing (living people)